Special Tactics and Rescue may refer to:

Real-life Emergency Response Agencies
Hamilton County Special Tactics and Rescue Service (STARS) team, Hamilton County, Tennessee, USA.
Jefferson County Special Tactics and Rescue (STAR) team, New York, USA.
Singapore Police Force's Special Tactics and Rescue (Singapore) team. The country's equivalent of a SWAT/HRT team.
South Australia Police's Special Tasks and Rescue team.

in Fiction
Raccoon Police Department's Special Tactics and Rescue Service (S.T.A.R.S.) unit, appearing in the Resident Evil video game series.